Division No. 13 is one of eighteen census divisions in the province of Saskatchewan, Canada, as defined by Statistics Canada. It is located in the western part of the province, bordering Alberta. The most populous community in this division is Kindersley.

Demographics 

Census subdivisions 
The following census subdivisions (municipalities or municipal equivalents) are located within Saskatchewan's Division No. 13.

Cities
none

Towns
Cut Knife
Kerrobert
Kindersley
Luseland
Macklin
Scott
Unity
Wilkie

Villages

Brock
Coleville
Denzil
Dodsland
Flaxcombe
Landis
Major
Marengo
Marsden
Neilburg
Netherhill
Plenty
Ruthilda
Senlac
Smiley
Tramping Lake

Rural municipalities

 RM No. 290 Kindersley
 RM No. 292 Milton
 RM No. 319 Winslow
 RM No. 320 Oakdale
 RM No. 321 Prairiedale
 RM No. 322 Antelope Park
 RM No. 349 Grandview
 RM No. 350 Mariposa
 RM No. 351 Progress
 RM No. 352 Heart's Hill
 RM No. 379 Reford
 RM No. 380 Tramping Lake
 RM No. 381 Grass Lake
 RM No. 382 Eye Hill
 RM No. 409 Buffalo
 RM No. 410 Round Valley
 RM No. 411 Senlac
 RM No. 439 Cut Knife
 RM No. 440 Hillsdale
 RM No. 442 Manitou Lake

Indian reserves
 Indian Reserve - Little Pine 116
 Indian Reserve - Poundmaker 114

See also 
List of census divisions of Saskatchewan
List of communities in Saskatchewan

References

Division No. 13, Saskatchewan Statistics Canada

 
13